At least two warships of Japan have borne the name Kasagi:

 a  launched in 1898 and wrecked in 1916
 an  launched in 1944 but never completed. She was scrapped in 1946

Japanese Navy ship names
Imperial Japanese Navy ship names